Michal Kropík (born 20 February 1985) is a professional Czech football player who currently plays for FK Viktoria Žižkov. He has represented his country at youth international level.

References

External links
 
 Guardian Football
 

1985 births
Living people
Czech footballers
Czech Republic youth international footballers
Czech First League players
FK Viktoria Žižkov players
1. FK Příbram players
FK Bohemians Prague (Střížkov) players
FC Sellier & Bellot Vlašim players
Association football midfielders